Dan-Ola Eckerman (born 26 March 1963 in Turku, died 25 May 1994 in Turku) was a Finnish football goalkeeper.

Eckerman spent his entire career in his hometown club Turun Palloseura. From 1983 to 1991 he played 175 matches in the Premier Division. He also had four international caps in Finland national football team.

Sources
 "TPS legends" page 

Finnish footballers
Finland international footballers
Association football goalkeepers
Turun Palloseura footballers
1963 births
1994 deaths
Footballers from Turku
20th-century Finnish people